René Boileau may refer to:

René Boileau (ice hockey) (1904–1969), Canadian NHL player
René Boileau (politician) (1754–1831), Canadian politician